This is a list of football stadiums in Kosovo, ranked in descending order of capacity.

Existing stadiums

National stadiums

Other

See also
List of association football stadiums by capacity
List of stadiums in Europe
List of European stadiums by capacity

References

Footnotes

Kosovo
 
Kosovo sport-related lists
Lists of buildings and structures in Kosovo